The 2011–12 Elitserien was the 78th season of the top division of Swedish handball. 14 teams competed in the league. The eight highest placed teams qualified for the playoffs, whereas teams 11–13 had to play relegation playoffs against teams from the second division, and team 14 was relegated automatically. Eskilstuna Guif won the regular season, but IK Sävehof won the playoffs and claimed their fifth Swedish title.

League table

Playoffs bracket

An asterisk (*) denotes result after extra time

Attendance

References 

Swedish handball competitions